Pavel Nikolayevich Korpachev (born 12 January 1986 in Sverdlovsk, Soviet Union) is a Russian freestyle skier. He was a participant at the 2014 Winter Olympics in Sochi.

References

External links 
 sports-reference

1986 births
Freestyle skiers at the 2014 Winter Olympics
Living people
Olympic freestyle skiers of Russia
Russian male freestyle skiers